The Tree Point Light is a lighthouse located adjacent to Revillagigedo Channel in Southeast Alaska, United States. It is located near the southernmost point of mainland Alaska.

History

The Lighthouse Board approved the construction of the Tree Point Lighthouse on April 24, 1903, and just over a year later the light was activated on April 30, 1904. The lighthouse was the first, and only lighthouse, to be built on mainland Alaska. In the early 1930s, the Bureau of Lighthouses authorized reconstruction of the station with reinforced concrete. Work began in 1933 and was completed in 1935. The 1935 lighthouse was equipped with a fourth-order Fresnel lens, which is now displayed at the Tongass Historical Museum in Ketchikan, Alaska. In 1969 it was automated. The Fresnel lens was replaced with a lens mounted outside the lantern room. In the summer of 1977 the lens on the gallery was replaced with a modern, solar-powered VRB-25 Vega lens placed back inside the lantern room.

The lighthouse was listed on the National Register of Historic Places as an historic district in 2004.  Its 2003 NRHP nomination stated that it was "the most intact [lighthouse] outpost in the southern section of Southeast Alaska. The listing includes the concrete light and fog-signal building built in 1935, one standing keeper residence, the two original oil houses, the later-period boathouse, and features of the water supply system. In addition, the tramway run is relatively intact."  Additional features of a derrick and winch were deemed non-contributing, because they are relatively recent replacements.

See also

List of lighthouses in the United States
National Register of Historic Places listings in Ketchikan Gateway Borough, Alaska

References

External links

  
 Lighthouse Friends — Tree Point Lighthouse
 

1904 establishments in Alaska
Art Deco architecture in Alaska
Historic districts on the National Register of Historic Places in Alaska
Lighthouses completed in 1904
Lighthouses completed in 1935
Lighthouses on the National Register of Historic Places in Alaska
Buildings and structures on the National Register of Historic Places in Ketchikan Gateway Borough, Alaska
Octagonal buildings in the United States
Tongass National Forest